Soliman an alternative to Suleiman may refer to:

People

Given name 
 Soliman Kenawy, Egyptian journalist

Surname 
 Soliman (surname)

Places 
 Soliman, Tunisia, located in the Nabeul Governorate

See also
 Sulaiman Mountains
 Sulaiman (disambiguation), another transliteration of the Arabic name sometimes rendered as Soliman
 Suleiman, another transliteration of the Arabic name sometimes rendered as Soliman
 Suleman (disambiguation), another transliteration of the Arabic name sometimes rendered as Soliman
 Solomon (disambiguation), another transliteration of the Arabic name sometimes rendered as Soliman

Egyptian masculine given names